Princess Carole Ann Radziwiłł (born August 20, 1963) is an American journalist, author, and television personality.

Throughout the course of nearly two decades working as a journalist and producer for ABC News, Radziwill's reporting earned her three Emmy Awards, a Peabody Award, and a GLAAD Media Award. After leaving ABC News, she wrote a memoir, called What Remains: A Memoir of Fate, Friendship and Love. Released in 2005, it became a New York Times bestseller. From 2012 to 2018, Radziwill appeared as a main cast member on the Bravo reality series The Real Housewives of New York City.

Early life and education 
Carole Ann DiFalco was born on August 20, 1963, and grew up in a working-class family in Suffern, New York. She is of Italian descent. She earned a B.A. in English at Hunter College and an M.B.A. at New York University.

Career

Journalism and writing 
Radziwill began her news career at ABC in New York, in 1985, as an intern in postproduction for 20/20, a news magazine show. She was later assigned to Close Up as a production secretary. Radziwill eventually worked for Peter Jennings' documentary unit, producing shows on abortion and gun control, and covering foreign policy stories in Cambodia, Haiti, and India.

In 1991, Radziwill was stationed in Iraq and reported on the SCUD missile attacks during the Gulf War. In 2003, during the War in Afghanistan, she spent six weeks in Kandahar, embedded with an infantry unit of the 101st Airborne Division. She produced segments for an ABC-TV show called Profiles from the Frontline. Radziwill has won several awards, including three Emmys, one for a story she produced on land mines in Cambodia, a Peabody, and a GLAAD award.

After her husband's death, Radziwill left ABC News to write a memoir about her personal life, her career at ABC News, as well as her effort to manage her husband's cancer. What Remains: A Memoir of Fate, Friendship and Love (Scribner, 2005) made the New York Times Best Seller List. A review of the book in The New York Times called it a "bittersweet account" that emphasized "graciousness over disclosure."

Radziwill signed with Glamour magazine to write a monthly column called Lunch Date. Her Lunch Dates have included former New York City mayor Rudy Giuliani as well as Hollywood actors Antonio Banderas, Rachel Weisz, and Alec Baldwin.

She sold her first novel, The Widow's Guide to Sex & Dating, to Holt Publishing. It was released on February 11, 2014.

Reality TV 
In 2011, Radziwill joined the cast of Bravo TV's The Real Housewives of New York City. On July 25, 2018, she announced she was leaving the show after six seasons (seasons 5–10). Radziwill said she wanted to go back to journalism.

Personal life 
On August 27, 1994, she and her fellow ABC News producer, Prince Anthony Radziwiłł, married in East Hampton, New York. Her husband died of cancer on August 10, 1999.

Radziwill briefly dated Russ Irwin of Aerosmith. Irwin appears on Bravo's "Real Housewives of New York City", Season 5.

In 2014, Radziwill started dating chef Adam Kenworthy, 21 years her junior. The pair dated on and off before announcing their split in 2017.

Following the arrest of socialite Ghislaine Maxwell for sex trafficking, images of Radziwill photographed with Maxwell resurfaced online. Radziwill also appears in the contact book of American financier and convicted sex offender Jeffrey Epstein. Radziwill stated she was "friendly" with Maxwell in the early 2000s, but hasn't spoken with her in over a decade. Radziwill denied knowing Epstein and stated she was unaware of any misconduct.

References

External links 
 

1963 births
20th-century American journalists
21st-century American memoirists
21st-century American novelists
21st-century American women writers
American writers of Italian descent
American war correspondents
American women journalists
American women memoirists
American women novelists
Bouvier family
Hunter College alumni
Living people
New York University Stern School of Business alumni
News & Documentary Emmy Award winners
Novelists from New York (state)
Peabody Award winners
People from Rockland County, New York
Place of birth missing (living people)
Carole
The Real Housewives cast members
Women war correspondents
Writers from Manhattan